Baierbrunn is a municipality in the district of Munich in the south-German state Bavaria. It is located between Schäftlarn and Pullach on the Bundesstraße 11 and consists of the two villages Baierbrunn and Buchenhain. Baierbrunn has a stop on the S7 of the Munich S-Bahn.

History 
Some remains of a hillfort from the Early Middle Ages, called Birg, can be found on the area of the municipality of Baierbrunn. The earliest known mentioning of Baierbrunn was in 776 on a deed of gift from Kloster Schäftlarn. It became an independent municipality in 1818. The village of Buchenhain started 1900 with an inn called "Waldgasthof".
There used to be a ski slope until late 1930's, which remains are still visible today in the south of Baierbrunn.
The municipality was part of the men's individual road race at the summer Olympics of Munich in 1972

Transport 
Both are served by the Munich S-Bahn. Line is S7. The rails are single trail since previous station  and trains cross at Baierbrunn station.

Web Links

 Homepage of Baierbrunn Municipality
 Homepage of S-Bahn Munich

References

Sources 
 Alfred Hutterer: Am Brunnen der Baiern. Baierbrunn 1985
 Joachim Lauchs: Baierbrunn. Eine Chronik, Verlag Wort & Bild Becker, Baierbrunn 1988, ISBN 3-927216-00-3

Munich (district)